The 1977–78 Luxembourg National Division was the 64th season of top level association football in Luxembourg.

Overview
It was performed in 12 teams, and FC Progrès Niedercorn won the championship.

League standings

Results

References
Luxembourg - List of final tables (RSSSF)

Luxembourg National Division seasons
Lux
football